Nicolas Corti (born 2 June 1995), known as Nico Corti, is a Belgian footballer.

Career

Youth & college
Corti played five years of college soccer at Stanford University between 2013 and 2017, including a redshirted year in 2013.

While at college, Corti played with USL PDL side Burlingame Dragons.

Professional 
Corti joined United Soccer League side Rio Grande Valley FC on 18 January 2018. He made his professional debut on 16 March 2018 in a 1–1 draw with Saint Louis FC.

Personal 
Corti was born in Brussels, but was raised in the south of France and California in the United States. He holds Belgian, French and American citizenship.

References

External links 
 Nico Corti at Stanford Cardinal 
 
 Nico Corti at Rio Grande Valley FC Toros

1995 births
Living people
American soccer players
Association football goalkeepers
Belgian emigrants to France
Belgian emigrants to the United States
Belgian expatriate footballers
Belgian footballers
Burlingame Dragons FC players
French footballers
Expatriate soccer players in the United States
People from Westlake Village, California
Rio Grande Valley FC Toros players
Soccer players from California
Sportspeople from Los Angeles County, California
Sportspeople from Ventura County, California
Stanford Cardinal men's soccer players
USL League Two players
USL Championship players
Footballers from Brussels